Seyi, Oluseyi, or Oluwaseyi is a Yoruba unisex given name and an occasional surname. Notable people with the name include:

Given name 
Oluseyi Petinrin, Nigerian Air Force officer
Josephine Oluseyi Williams, Nigerian financial expert
Oluseyi Smith, Canadian sprinter
Oluseyi Bajulaiye, United Nations official
Seyi Ajirotutu, soccer player
Oluwaseyi Makinde, Nigerian businessman
Samuel Oluwaseyi Ameobi, professional footballer
Oluwaseyi Babajide "Sheyi" Ojo, English footballer
Oluwaseyi Akerele, Nigerian record producer and songwriter
Joseph "Joe" Oluwaseyi Temitope Ayodele-Aribo, English professional footballer
Seyi Abolaji, American soccer player
Seyi Akiwowo, British women's rights activist and campaigner
Adam Adeoye Oluwaseyi Yusuff, English professional footballer
Seyi Shay, Nigerian-based singer and songwriter
Seyi Olofinjana, Nigerian professional footballer

Surname 
Hakeem M. Oluseyi

Yoruba given names
Yoruba-language surnames